Digha (Dighe, Digha Talav) is a small township near Airoli in Navi Mumbai, India.

Digha is in district Thane. Its Postal Index Number  is 400708.

References 

Cities and towns in Thane district
Navi Mumbai